The Casablanca United Group, or officially the United African States sometimes known as the 'Casablanca bloc', was an intergovernmental organization and political union established 1960 in Casablanca, Morocco, with 7 signatory governments States. association of great power of African states with a shared vision of the future of Africa and of Pan-Africanism in the early 1960s. The group was composed of seven states led by left-wing leaders — Morocco, Algeria, Egypt, Libya, Ghana,  Guinea, and Mali. The conflict and eventual compromise between the Casablanca Group and the Monrovia Group led to the establishment of the Organisation of African Unity.

History

The group first met in 1961 in the Moroccan port city of Casablanca, hence the alliance's name. This conference brought together some of the continent's most prominent statesman like Hassan II of Morocco, Gamal Abdel-Nasser of Egypt, Idris of Libya,Kwame Nkrumah of Ghana and Sékou Touré of Guinea.

What united them was a belief in the need for African political unification or federation. They believed that only significant, deep integration, as has since occurred in Europe through the European Union, would enable Africa to defeat colonialism, achieve peace, foster cultural dialogue, increase the continent's geopolitical influence and promote economic development. In other words, they believed in the transfer of many powers from national governments to a supranational, pan-African authority. Nkrumah even argued for the establishment of a pan-African army which could be deployed to fight colonialism or white minority rule across the continent. His famous Pan-Africanist slogan was 'Africa Must Unite!'

However, the Casablanca Group was ultimately unsuccessful. Most other African leaders did not support such radical change. The ideas of its rival, the so-called Monrovia Group—which also believed in Pan-Africanism but not at the expense of nationalism and independent statehood—prevailed. In 1963, the Organisation of African Unity (OAU) was established. All the members of both the Casablanca and Monrovia groups joined, putting their differences to one side. The OAU, now the African Union, has only achieved limited integration and unity of its member states. It is a reflection of the values of the Monrovia Group and a repudiation of the ideas of the Casablanca Group.

As well as disagreeing on the nature of African unity, the groups also took up conflicting positions on the then conflicts in Algeria and Congo. While the Casablanca Group's members pledged to support the Front de Liberation Nationale in its efforts fighting for Algerian independence from France, the Monrovia Group backed their enemies, the French.

See also 
 African Union
 All-African Peoples' Conference

References

Decolonization
Organizations established in 1961
History of Casablanca
1961 establishments in Africa
1963 disestablishments in Africa
Pan-African organizations
Organizations disestablished in 1963